The Government of the Czech Republic from 15 July 2002 to 4 August 2004 was formed after 2002 legislative election. It was a coalition government of the Czech Social Democratic Party (ČSSD), the Christian and Democratic Union - Czechoslovak People's Party (KDU-ČSL) and the Freedom Union - Democratic Union (US-DEU).

Czech government cabinets
Czech Social Democratic Party
KDU-ČSL
Freedom Union – Democratic Union
Coalition governments of the Czech Republic